The 2011 FEI Nations Cup Promotional League is the 2011 edition of the secondary international team Grand Prix show jumping competition run by the FEI.

European Promotional League

Standings 
A team of a country that belongs to one of the 2011 FEI Nations Cup teams can not earn points in this league.

The teams of this league can earn points in this league and in the Challengers League. The best six results will be count for the final ranking.

The best-placed team of the 2011 Promotional League Europe, Switzerland, move into the 2012 FEI Nations Cup. The second-placed to fourth-placed teams of the 2011 Promotional League Europe have the permission to start in the 2011 Promotional League Final.

Results

FEI Nations Cup of Belgium 
The Nations Cup of Belgium should be the first station of the 2011 European Promotional League. Near-term before the horse show it was deleted as Promotional League competition. So the Nations Cup of Belgium did not count for European Promotional League standings.

CSIO 4* – April 28, 2011 to May 1, 2011 – Lummen (Vlaams Feest van de Paardensport), 
Competition: Friday, April 29, 2011 – Start: 5:00 pm, prize money: 40000 €

(Top 5 of 10 Teams)Grey penalties points do not count for the team result, in the second round only three riders per team are allowed to start.

FEI Nations Cup of Austria 
CSIO 4* – May 12, 2011 to May 15, 2011 – Linz (Linzer Pferdefestival), 
Competition: Friday, May 13, 2011 – Start: 12:00 noon

(Top 7 of 15 Teams)Grey penalties points do not count for the team result, in the second round only three riders per team are allowed to start.

FEI Nations Cup of Denmark 
CSIO 4* – May 19, 2011 to May 22, 2011 – Copenhagen, 
Competition: Friday, May 20, 2011 – Start: 3:30 pm

(Top 6 of 15 Teams)Grey penalties points do not count for the team result, in the second round only three riders per team are allowed to start.

FEI Nations Cup of Portugal 
CSIO 3* – May 26, 2011 to May 29, 2011 – Lisbon, 
Competition: Friday, May 27, 2011 – Start: 6:00 pm

(Top 6 of 11 Teams)Grey penalties points do not count for the team result, in the second round only three riders per team are allowed to start.

FEI Nations Cup of Norway 
CSIO 3* – June 16, 2011 to June 19, 2011 – Drammen, 
Competition: Saturday, June 18, 2011

(Top 7 of 14 Teams)Grey penalties points do not count for the team result, in the second round only three riders per team are allowed to start.

FEI Nations Cup of Finland 
CSIO 3* – July 1, 2011 to July 3, 2011 – Hamina, 
Competition: Sunday, June 3, 2011

(Top 4 of 6 Teams)Grey penalties points do not count for the team result, in the second round only three riders per team are allowed to start.

FEI Nations Cup of Spain 
CSIO 5* Gijon – August 31, 2011 to September 5, 2011 – Gijon, 
Competition: Sunday, September 3, 2011

(Top 6 of 10 Teams)Grey penalties points do not count for the team result.

Challengers League

Standings 
A team of a country that belongs to one of the 2011 FEI Nations Cup teams can not earn points in this league.

The teams of this league can earn points in this league and in the European Promotional League. The best six results will be count for the final ranking.

The first-placed to third-placed teams of the 2011 Challengers League will have the permission to start in the 2011 Promotional League Final.

Results

FEI Nations Cup of Bulgaria 
CSIO 2* – June 2, 2011 to June 5, 2011 – Bozhurishte near Sofia, 
Competition: Friday, June 3, 2011 – Start: 2:00 pm

FEI Nations Cup of Greece 
CSIO 3*-W – June 9, 2011 to June 12, 2011 – Markopoulo Olympic Equestrian Centre near Athens, 
Competition: Friday, June 10, 2011

Grey penalties points do not count for the team result, in the second round only three riders per team are allowed to start.

FEI Nations Cup of Poland 
CSIO 3* – June 9, 2011 to June 12, 2011 – Sopot, 
Competition: Friday, June 10, 2011

(Top 7 of 11 Teams)Grey penalties points do not count for the team result, in the second round only three riders per team are allowed to start.

FEI Nations Cup of Belarus 
CSIO 2*-W – July 28, 2011 to July 31, 2011 – Minsk, 

Grey penalties points do not count for the team result, in the second round only three riders per team are allowed to start.

FEI Nations Cup of Slovakia 
CSIO 3*-W – August 11, 2011 to August 14, 2011 – Bratislava, 
Competition: Friday, August 12, 2011

Because of the rules of the FEI Nations Cup Promotional League, only 15 of the 17 participating teams can earn ranking points here.

(Top 8 of 17 Teams)Grey penalties points do not count for the team result, in the second round only three riders per team are allowed to start.

North and South American League

Final standings 
The best-placed team of the 2011 North and South American League, Canada, have the permission to start in the 2011 Promotional League Final.

A team of a country that belongs to one of the 2011 Meydan FEI Nations Cup teams can not earn points in this league. Teams who are part of one of the other Promotional Leagues also can not earn points in this league.

Results

FEI Nations Cup of Canada (2010) 

CSIO 5* – September 8, 2010 to September 12, 2010 – Spruce Meadows, Calgary, 
Competition: Saturday, September 11, 2010 at 12:00 pm

(Top 5 of 8 Teams)

FEI Nations Cup of Argentina (2010) 
CSIO 2*-W – November 9, 2010 to November 14, 2010 – Haras El Capricho, Capilla del Señor, 
Competition: Friday, November 12, 2010 – Start: 3:30 pm, prize money: 12000 Arg$

(Top 3 of 6 Teams)

FEI Nations Cup of the United States 
CSIO 4* – March 3, 2011 to March 6, 2011 – Wellington, Florida, 
Competition: Friday, March 4, 2011

(Top 5 of 8 Teams)

Promotional League Final 
The best-placed team of the 2011 Promotional League Final move into the 2012 FEI Nations Cup.

Sources / External links 
 2011 rules

 Promotional League